Iranian-Islamic nationalism is a type of religious nationalism which mixes Iranian nationalism with Islamism.

History 
Iranian Islamonationalism combines both the Iranian and Islamic elements. In the 1960s, Jalal Al-e Ahmad, an author, activist and public intellectual, began pushing the belief that Shia Islam was required as a part of Iranian identity. His essay, "Gharbzadegi" (Westoxication), which he wrote in 1962, was a critique of the Westernization in Iran. A part of it said that "enchantment by the West" is a "contagious disease" which may soon separate Iranians from their culture and religion. His 1964 pilgrimage to Mecca was a crucial point in the life of the sceptic Al-e Ahmad. It turned him from a communist sympathetic to a Shia fundamentalist who wanted the religious transformation of Iranian politics, and viewed Shia clergy as the guardians of native traditions against state-sponsored Westernization by the Pahlavi dynasty. In the 1970s, Ali Shariati, an Iranian sociologist and intellectual, emerged as a key person in the Iranian Islamonationalist movement. He was inspired by the Algerian National Liberation Front during his time in France in the 1960s, he also translated an anthology of Frantz Fanon into Persian. Unlike Fanon, Shariati believed that religion was needed in the struggle for freedom. Shariati viewed Shia Islam as the glue of Iran's society and as the nexus of the Iranian past, present and future. Like Al-e Ahmad, Shariati was extremely against the Iranian people being fascinated with the West, and urged them to "return to themselves". Shariati urged his supporters to not just simply wait for the return of the Imam Mehdi, but to hasten his return by fighting for justice.

After the Iranian Revolution 
Iranian Islamonationalism was a part of the Iranian Revolution's ideology as a result of the Islamonationalist activists of the 1960s and 1970s. Creating a Shia theocracy and confronting Westernization were parts of Khomeini's nationalism. Like Ali Ahmad, he warned against the "penetration of poisonous Western culture into Muslim nations", and he wanted to build an Iran that instills Shia Islam as the core of its national identity. Khomeini frequently challenged the Western-backed Saudi Arabia and he wanted to make Iran the capital of the Muslim world.

Politics 
Iranian Islamonationalists are mostly represented by the political faction known as the Religious-Nationalists. Although not all of them agree with the Religious-Nationalists faction because it is reformist, has leftist leanings, and that some Islamonationalists are just right-wing principlists who happen to hold nationalistic views.

See also 
Shariatism
Khomeinism

References

Iranian nationalism
Iranian Revolution
Islamic nationalism
Islamism
Syncretic political movements